Libido usually refers to sexual drive.

Libido may also refer to:

Music
 Líbido (band), a Peruvian rock group
 Libido (Brigitte Fontaine album), 2006 
 Libido (Buck-O-Nine album), 1999
 Libido (Líbido album), 1998
 Livid (Nightmare album), 2004, sometimes incorrectly called Libido
 "libidO", 2021 song by the South Korean K-Pop group OnlyOneOf

Film
 Libido (1965 film), a 1965 Italian thriller directed by Ernesto Gastaldi
 , a 1967 film directed by Kaneto Shindō
 Libido (1973 film), a 1973 Australian drama film
 Libido (2013 film), a 2013 Egyptian short documentary film

Other uses
 Libido language, a Cushitic language
 Libido (journal), an academic publication that won the 1999 Sexual Freedom Award for Publications